Motorcycling Ireland, MCI, Motor Cycle Union of Ireland (MCUI) is the governing body of motorcycle racing in the Republic of Ireland. On the 7th of March 2002 the MCUI became the first  Motorcycle Federation in the world to reach 100 years old.

The motorcycle racing is growing in popularity, in 2019 Mondello Park international circuit is hosting 26 motorcycle racing days, compared to 11 car racing days. Nonetheless, spiraling event insurance costs caused reduction of events in 2017.

Controversies
In 2016 Motorcycling Ireland blocked a beach race from taking place in Portmarnock on 22 May by submitting an objection to the Fingal County Council, who initially have approved the event. Motocross clubs promptly reorganized the event to an Open Grass Track event in Ballough Lusk, Co. Dublin the following weekend.

References

External links
Official Homepage

Motorcycle racing
Motorsport venues in the Republic of Ireland